In number theory, a lucky number is a natural number in a set which is generated by a certain "sieve". This sieve is similar to the Sieve of Eratosthenes that generates the primes, but it eliminates numbers based on their position in the remaining set, instead of their value (or position in the initial set of natural numbers).

The term was introduced in 1956 in a paper by Gardiner, Lazarus, Metropolis and Ulam.  They suggest also calling its defining sieve, "the sieve of Josephus Flavius" because of its similarity with the counting-out game in the Josephus problem.

Lucky numbers share some properties with primes, such as asymptotic behaviour according to the prime number theorem; also, a version of Goldbach's conjecture has been extended to them. There are infinitely many lucky numbers.  Twin lucky numbers and twin primes also appear to occur with similar frequency.  However, if Ln denotes the n-th lucky number, and pn the n-th prime, then Ln > pn for all sufficiently large n.

Because of their apparent similarities with the prime numbers, some mathematicians have suggested that some of their common properties may also be found in other sets of numbers generated by sieves of a certain unknown form, but there is little theoretical basis for this conjecture.

The sieving process

Continue removing the nth remaining numbers, where n is the next number in the list after the last surviving number. Next in this example is 9.

One way that the application of the procedure differs from that of the Sieve of Eratosthenes is that for n being the number being multiplied on a specific pass, the first number eliminated on the pass is the n-th remaining number that has not yet been eliminated, as opposed to the number 2n. That is to say, the list of numbers this sieve counts through is different on each pass (for example 1, 3, 7, 9, 13, 15, 19... on the third pass), whereas in the Sieve of Eratosthenes, the sieve always counts through the entire original list (1, 2, 3...).

When this procedure has been carried out completely, the remaining integers are the lucky numbers (those that happen to be prime are in bold):

 1, 3, 7, 9, 13, 15, 21, 25, 31, 33, 37, 43, 49, 51, 63, 67, 69, 73, 75, 79, 87, 93, 99, 105, 111, 115, 127, 129, 133, 135, 141, 151, 159, 163, 169, 171, 189, 193, 195, 201, 205, 211, 219, 223, 231, 235, 237, 241, 259, 261, 267, 273, 283, 285, 289, 297, 303, 307, 319, 321, 327, ... .

The lucky number which removes n from the list of lucky numbers is: (0 if n is a lucky number)
0, 2, 0, 2, 3, 2, 0, 2, 0, 2, 3, 2, 0, 2, 0, 2, 3, 2, 7, 2, 0, 2, 3, 2, 0, 2, 9, 2, 3, 2, 0, 2, 0, 2, 3, 2, 0, 2, 7, 2, 3, 2, 0, 2, 13, 2, 3, 2, 0, 2, 0, 2, 3, 2, 15, 2, 9, 2, 3, 2, 7, 2, 0, 2, 3, 2, 0, 2, 0, 2, 3, 2, 0, 2, 0, 2, 3, 2, 0, 2, 7, 2, 3, 2, 21, 2, ...

Lucky primes
A "lucky prime" is a lucky number that is prime. They are:
3, 7, 13, 31, 37, 43, 67, 73, 79, 127, 151, 163, 193, 211, 223, 241, 283, 307, 331, 349, 367, 409, 421, 433, 463, 487, 541, 577, 601, 613, 619, 631, 643, 673, 727, 739, 769, 787, 823, 883, 937, 991, 997, ... .
It has been conjectured that there are infinitely many lucky primes.

See also 
Lucky numbers of Euler
Fortunate number
Happy number
Harshad number
Gambling
Lottery
Keno

References

Further reading

External links 
 Lucky Numbers by Enrique Zeleny, The Wolfram Demonstrations Project.
 

Integer sequences